Monthly usually refers to the scheduling of something every month. It may also refer to:
 The Monthly
 Monthly Magazine
 Monthly Review
 PQ Monthly
 Home Monthly
 Trader Monthly
 Overland Monthly
 Menstruation, sometimes known as "monthly"